Laguna is a district of the Zarcero canton, in the Alajuela province of Costa Rica.

Geography 
Laguna has an area of  km² and an elevation of  metres.

Locations
 Poblados (villages): Peña

Demographics 

For the 2011 census, Laguna had a population of  inhabitants.

Transportation

Road transportation 
The district is covered by the following road routes:
 National Route 141

References 

Districts of Alajuela Province
Populated places in Alajuela Province